Charles Flandrau may refer to:
 Charles Eugene Flandrau (1828–1903), American lawyer
 Charles Macomb Flandrau (1871–1938), his son, American writer